Jakub Karbownik (born 15 March 2001) is a Polish professional footballer who plays as a winger for Garbarnia Kraków.

Career statistics

Club

References

2001 births
Living people
Sportspeople from Bełchatów
Polish footballers
Poland youth international footballers
Association football wingers
Lech Poznań II players
Lech Poznań players
GKS Katowice players
Garbarnia Kraków players
I liga players
II liga players
III liga players